The 2002 Australia rugby union tour, also known as the 2002 Wallabies spring tour, was a series of matches played in November 2002 in Argentina, England, Ireland and Italy by the Australia national rugby union team.

First test: Argentina 

Argentina: 15.Ignacio Corleto, 14.José María Núñez Piossek, 13.José Orengo, 12.Lisandro Arbizu (capt.), 11.Diego Albanese, 10.Felipe Contepomi, 9.Agustín Pichot, 8.Gonzalo Longo Elia , 7.Rolando Martín, 6.Santiago Phelan, 5.Rimas Álvarez Kairelis, 4.Carlos Ignacio Fernández Lobbe, 3.Omar Hasan, 2.Federico Méndez, 1.Mauricio Reggiardo – replacements: 16.Mario Ledesma Arocena, 17.Roberto Grau, 19.Martín Durand     –  No entry : 18.Pedro Sporleder. 20.Nicolás Fernández Miranda, 21.Juan Fernández Miranda, 22.Gonzalo Camardón    
Australia: 15.Mat Rogers, 14.Ben Tune, 13.Matt Burke, 12.Dan Herbert, 11.Stirling Mortlock , 10.Stephen Larkham, 9.George Gregan (capt.), 8.Toutai Kefu, 7.George Smith, 6.Matt Cockbain, 5.Justin Harrison, 4.Dan Vickerman, 3.Patricio Noriega, 2.Jeremy Paul, 1.Bill Young,  – replacements: 16.Adam Freier, 17.Ben Darwin, 18.David Giffin, 19.David Croft, 20.Chris Whitaker, 21.Elton Flatley, 22.Wendell Sailor

Second test: Ireland 

Ireland:  15.Girvan Dempsey, 14.Shane Horgan, 13.Brian O'Driscoll (capt.), 12.Kevin Maggs, 11.Denis Hickie, 10.Ronan O'Gara, 9.Peter Stringer, 8.Anthony Foley, 7.Keith Gleeson, 6.Victor Costello, 5.Malcolm O'Kelly, 4.Gary Longwell, 3.John Hayes, 2.Shane Byrne, 1.Reggie Corrigan – replacements: 16.Frankie Sheahan, 18.Leo Cullen, 19.Alan Quinlan     –  No entry : 17.Marcus Horan20.Guy Easterby      
Australia:  15.Matt Burke, 14.Wendell Sailor, 13.Stirling Mortlock, 12.Dan Herbert, 11.Scott Staniforth, 10.Stephen Larkham, 9.George Gregan (capt.), 8.Toutai Kefu, 7.George Smith, 6.Matt Cockbain, 5.David Giffin, 4.Owen Finegan, 3.Patricio Noriega, 2.Adam Freier, 1.Nick Stiles,  – replacements: 16.Brendan Cannon, 17.Ben Darwin, 18.Justin Harrison, 19.David Croft    –  No entry: 20.Chris Whitaker

Third test: England 

England:   15.Jason Robinson, 14.James Simpson-Daniel, 13.Will Greenwood, 12.Mike Tindall, 11.Ben Cohen, 10.Jonny Wilkinson, 9.Matt Dawson, 8.Richard Hill, 7.Neil Back, 6.Lewis Moody, 5.Ben Kay, 4.Martin Johnson (capt.), 3.Phil Vickery, 2.Steve Thompson, 1.Jason Leonard – replacements: 19.Lawrence Dallaglio, 21.Austin Healey      –  No entry : 16.Mark Regan, 17.Robbie Morris, 18.Danny Grewcock, 20.Andy Gomarsall, 22.Tim Stimpson   
Australia:  15.Matt Burke, 14.Wendell Sailor, 13.Dan Herbert, 12.Elton Flatley, 11.Stirling Mortlock, 10.Stephen Larkham, 9.George Gregan (capt.), 8.Toutai Kefu, 7.George Smith, 6.Matt Cockbain, 5.Justin Harrison, 4.Dan Vickerman, 3.Patricio Noriega, 2.Jeremy Paul, 1.Bill Young,  – replacements: 16.Adam Freier, 17.Ben Darwin, 18.David Giffin, 19.David Croft, 21.Matt Giteau   –  No entry: 20.Chris Whitaker, 22.Scott Staniforth

Fourth test: Italy 

Italy:  15.Mirco Bergamasco, 14.Paolo Vaccari, 13.Cristian Stoica, 12.Matteo Barbini, 11.Nicola Mazzucato, 10.Ramiro Pez, 9.Juan Manuel Queirolo, 8.Sergio Parisse, 7.Mauro Bergamasco, 6.Aaron Persico, 5.Marco Bortolami (capt.), 4.Enrico Pavanello, 3.Martin Castrogiovanni, 2.Fabio Ongaro, 1.Andrea Lo Cicero – replacements: 16.Andrea Moretti, 17.Gianluca Faliva, 18.Mark Giacheri, 19.Gert Peens, 20.Alessandro Troncon, 21.Scott Palmer, 22.Cristian Zanoletti  
'Australia: 15.Stirling Mortlock, 14.Wendell Sailor, 13.Matt Burke, 12.Dan Herbert, 11.Scott Staniforth, 10.Elton Flatley, 9.George Gregan (capt.), 8.Toutai Kefu, 7.George Smith, 6.Matt Cockbain, 5.Justin Harrison, 4.Dan Vickerman, 3.Patricio Noriega, 2.Adam Freier, 1.Bill Young,  – replacements: 16.Brendan Cannon, 17.Ben Darwin, 18.David Giffin, 19.David Croft, 20.Chris Whitaker, 21.Matt Giteau, 22.Mark Bartholomeusz  –  No entry:

References 
 Memorias de la UAR 2002
 
 

 

 

2002 rugby union tours
2002 in Australian rugby union
2002
2002
2002 in Argentine rugby union
2002–03 in English rugby union
2002–03 in Irish rugby union
2002–03 in Italian rugby union
2002
2002
2002
2002
History of rugby union matches between Argentina and Australia
History of rugby union matches between Australia and England